Nuevo Progreso, Tamaulipas is a Mexican town in Río Bravo Municipality in the state of Tamaulipas located on the U.S.-Mexican border, a part of the binational Reynosa–McAllen metropolitan area. The Progreso-Nuevo Progreso International Bridge connects the town with Progreso Lakes, Texas. The 2010 census showed a population of 10,178 inhabitants.

Nuevo Progreso is known as one of the safest border towns in Tamaulipas, and is a popular medical tourism destination. There are over 100 dentists and 100 pharmacies in the five-block center of Nuevo Progreso. Nuevo Progreso is not a major trade route for commerce, and most tourists cross the border on foot. In addition to medical services, Nuevo Progreso also has restaurants and shops.

External links
 Shop Progreso.com

References

Populated places in Tamaulipas
Lower Rio Grande Valley
Tamaulipas populated places on the Rio Grande